

Arthropods

Insects

Conodonts

Vertebrates

Dinosaurs

Newly named dinosaurs 
Data courtesy of George Olshevsky's dinosaur genera list.

Synapsids

Non-mammalian

References

1930s in paleontology
Paleontology 4